Dana Dogaru (born 1 August 1953) is a Romanian actress. In 2017 she received the Gopo Awards for best actress for her role in Sieranevada.

Born in Bucharest, she graduated in 1976 from the Caragiale National University of Theatre and Film, where she studied under .

She made her theater debut the same year as Eva in The Broken Jug by Heinrich von Kleist.

Selected filmography

References

External links 

1953 births
Living people
Film people from Bucharest
Caragiale National University of Theatre and Film alumni
Romanian film actresses